Nuria Sheikh Farah is a Kenyan entrepreneur of Somali ethnicity. She is the owner of Risala Enterprises Ltd. Farah is also the founder and Chairperson of the Gargaar NGO.

Personal life
Farah was born to an ethnic Somali family in the North Eastern Province, Kenya.

For her post-secondary studies, she earned a Bachelor of Education. As of April 2010, she was working toward a Masters in Business Administration at the University of Nairobi.

Farah is Muslim.

Career
In 1995, Farah founded Risala Enterprises Ltd.. The private firm imports a full range of home furniture, as well as various household goods from Egypt, the Gulf states, Syria and Iran. Its fleet of trucks also transport petroleum products to other areas.

Additionally, she was a civil servant for a number of years in the Ministry of Education of Kenya.

In 2007, Farah established Gargaar, a non-governmental organization based in the North Eastern Province. The NGO aims to empower women on modern issues as well as provide educational initiatives to children.

Along with the United States Agency for International Development, she also launched a school construction program in the province.

In 2010, Farah was among 250 global delegates invited to participate in A New Beginning: The Presidential Summit on Entrepreneurship held in Washington, D.C. She was chosen for her work with her organization in addition to her business experience. The two-day international conference was organized by the US presidency, and sought to promote entrepreneurship through innovation and technology, funding, mentoring and encouraging entrepreneurship among youth. It also championed political reform via grassroots commercial development projects.

See also
Omar A. Ali

References

Living people
Kenyan people of Somali descent
Kenyan civil servants
Women civil servants
Chairpersons of non-governmental organizations
21st-century Kenyan businesswomen
21st-century Kenyan businesspeople
Year of birth missing (living people)
20th-century Kenyan businesswomen
20th-century Kenyan businesspeople